Proszówka  is a village in the administrative district of Gmina Gryfów Śląski, within Lwówek Śląski County, Lower Silesian Voivodeship, in south-western Poland.

The most known landmark of Proszówka is the Gryf Castle, a medieval stronghold of local Polish dukes of the Piast dynasty. Other landmarks are the 17th-century Baroque chapel of St. Leopold and the 18th-century palace complex.

References

Villages in Lwówek Śląski County